In Tongan mythology, Taufa was a sea god worshipped by chief Tungi of East Tongatapu and by the royal family of Tonga because he cured the Tongan king George I (ruled 1845–1893).

He also protects gardens.  In order for a homeowner to gain this protection, they had to braid a coconut leaf into a shark shape.

Taufa is both a sea and a land god.  As a sea god he appears as a shark.

References
R.D. Craig, Dictionary of Polynesian Mythology (Greenwood Press: New York, 1989), 267.
Collocot, E. E.V. "Notes on Tongan Religion." The Journal of the Polynesian Society. N.p., n.d. Web.

Tongan deities
Sea and river gods
Earth gods